2,3,5,6,8-Pentahydroxy-1,4-naphthalenedione, also called 2,3,5,6,8-pentahydroxy-1,4-naphthoquinone or spinochrome D, is an organic compound with formula , formally derived from 1,4-naphthoquinone through the replacement of five hydrogen atoms by hydroxyl (OH) groups.

Spinochrome D occurs naturally as a brownish red pigment in the shell and spines of sea urchins such as the Japanese aka-uni (Pseudocentrotus depressus).  It is soluble in diethyl ether and crystallizes as brownish red needles that sublime at 285−295 °C.

The compound gives a yellowish brown solution when treated with sodium hydroxide, a bluish green solution with ferric chloride, and a violet precipitate with lead acetate. It forms a five-fold acetate ester,5, that crystallizes from methanol as yellow needles that melt at 185−186 °C.

See also 
 Hexahydroxynaphthoquinone (spinochrome E)
 2,3,5,7-Tetrahydroxy-1,4-naphthoquinone (spinochrome B)

References 

1,4-Naphthoquinones
Catechols
Hydroxyquinols
Polyols
Hydroxynaphthoquinones